Hipolito (Paul) Roldan, (born 1944 New York City) is an affordable housing developer in Chicago.

In 2001, he participated in a comprehensive community planning effort to manage development in Humboldt Park, Chicago, on the city's west side.  The HHDC, along with two other housing development corporations—Latin United Community Housing Development (LUCHA) and Bickerdike Redevelopment Corp., received city funding and support to develop significant affordable housing programs.

In 2005, the organization was ranked fifth among the nation's Latino nonprofits, by Hispanic Business magazine.

He is a ULI inner-city adviser and national trustee.  He serves on many committees and boards, including Boston's Housing Partnership Network, and the National Puerto Rican Coalition. He was a participant in President Bill Clinton's economic conferences held in Little Rock, Arkansas, in 1992 and Columbus, Ohio, in 1995.

His 2019 compensation was at $2,208,365, amounting to 16.4% of the Hispanic Housing Development Corporation's revenue, ranking him the 7th highest compensated nonprofit CEO, slightly less than Wynton Marsalis, the Managing and artistic director of Jazz at Lincoln Center.

Awards
 2009 Lifetime Industry Leadership Award
 2005 Builder of the Year by El Nuevo Constructor magazine
 2002 Friend of the Neighborhoods 
 1988 MacArthur Fellows Program

References

1944 births
Activists from New York City
Affordable housing advocacy organizations
Housing reformers
Living people
MacArthur Fellows